Eric-Nathan Marvin Kendricks (born February 29, 1992) is an American football linebacker for the Los Angeles Chargers of the National Football League (NFL). He played college football for the UCLA Bruins. As a senior in 2014, he won the Butkus Award as the nation's top collegiate linebacker. Kendricks was drafted by the Minnesota Vikings in the second round of the 2015 NFL Draft.

Early years
Kendricks was born to Yvonne Thagon and Marvin Kendricks, a former running back for UCLA who played professionally in the Canadian Football League (CFL). He grew up with older brother Mychal and younger sister Danielle. They were raised by Thagon, their single mother, who had split from their father, Marvin, who became addicted to crack cocaine. By the time Kendricks started high school, Marvin cleaned himself up. He married and took a job, and arranged with Thagon to be involved in his kids' lives.

High school career
Kendricks attended Herbert Hoover High School in Fresno, California, where he earned three letters for coach Pat Plummer playing linebacker, quarterback, running back, kicker, and punter and serving as team captain his junior and senior seasons. He was teammates with his brother as a sophomore in 2007. As a junior in 2008, he was named first-team All-league defense and was credited with 85 tackles and two sacks, as well as 10 touchdowns on offense. As a senior in 2009, he registered 117 tackles and two interceptions on defense and scored 14 touchdowns on offense. For his senior season efforts, he was named first-team All-league defense by the Fresno Bee. Kendricks also earned multiple letters in basketball (team captain and first-team All-league in '09) for coach Nick French and baseball (first-team All-league in '09 and '10) for coach Sam Flores. He was named 2010 male Tri-Athlete of the Year at his school.

Regarded as a three-star recruit by Rivals.com, Kendricks was ranked No. 60 among outside linebackers and No. 92 among all players in the state of California. Also viewed as a three-star prospect by Scout.com, he was rated No. 42 among middle linebackers nationally and No. 88 in California. He was named to the GoldenStatePreps.com All-State third-team and All-NorCal first-team. Kendricks committed to the University of California, Los Angeles (UCLA) to play college football in November 2009.

College career

Kendricks played for the Bruins from 2010 to 2014. After redshirting in 2010, Kendricks played in 14 games with three starts as a redshirt freshman in 2011. He finished the season ranking second on the team in tackles with 76, tied for fourth with 4.5 tackles for loss and tied for second with two sacks. He earned an honorable mention Freshman All-American by College Football News and honorable mention Pac-12 All-Academic team. He also received the John Boncheff Jr. Memorial team award for Rookie of the Year at the annual team banquet.

As a 14-game starter as a sophomore in 2012, Kendricks was named honorable mention All-Pac-12 by the coaches, received the Donn Moomaw Award for Outstanding Defensive Player against USC at the annual team awards banquet and was an honorable mention academic All-conference. He led the Pac-12 in tackles with an average of 10.64, a mark which ranked 11th in the nation, becoming the first Bruin to lead the conference in tackles since Spencer Havner in 2004. Kendricks also returned two fumbles for touchdowns (Houston, at Washington State), blocked a punt (USC) and made his first career interception (USC). His total of 150 tackles was the most by a Bruin player since Jerry Robinson registered a school-record 161 stops in 1978. He recorded nine games with double-digit tackles, including in each of the last seven games of the season.

In Kendricks' 2013 junior campaign, he led the team in tackles for the second straight season with 105 tackles and ranked third in the Pac-12 in tackles average with an 8.8 per game mark. He was an honorable mention All-conference academic team. He was awarded the N.N. Sugarman Award for Best Leadership on defense, the UCLA Captains Award and the Bruin Force Award at the team banquet.

Kendricks entered his senior season in 2014 as a starter for the third straight year. He led the Football Bowl Subdivision with 149 solo tackles, and set the UCLA record for career tackles with 481, breaking the previous mark of 468 set by Jerry Robinson (1976–1978). In the Bruins' 40–35 win over Kansas State in the Alamo Bowl, Kendricks was named the game's defensive most valuable player after recording 10 tackles, including three tackles for loss. For the season, he won the Butkus Award, given annually to the top linebacker in college football and becoming UCLA's first winner. The Walter Camp Football Foundation selected him as a second-team All-American, and he was also named second-team All-Pac-12.

College statistics

Awards and honors
 Second-team All-American (2014
 Second-team All-Pac-12 (2014)
 Alamo Bowl Defensive MVP (2015)
 Butkus Award (2014)
 Lott Trophy (2014)

Professional career

Pre-draft
Kendricks solidified his status as one of the draft's top linebackers with an impressive performance at the 2015 NFL Combine; his 4.61 40-yard dash was one of the fastest times among linebackers. At the conclusion of the pre-draft process, he was ranked as the top inside linebacker prospect by DraftScout.com, the second ranked inside linebacker by NFL analyst Charles Davis, the third best linebacker prospect by Sports Illustrated and was ranked the fourth best linebacker prospect by NFL analyst Mike Mayock.

Minnesota Vikings
The Minnesota Vikings selected Kendricks in the second round with the 45th overall pick in the 2015 NFL Draft. The Vikings also selected former UCLA linebacker Anthony Barr in the previous draft, reuniting the teammates in the NFL. Kendricks was the sixth linebacker drafted in 2015.

On May 7, 2015, the Minnesota Vikings signed Kendricks to a four-year, $5.15 million contract that included $2.67 million guaranteed and a signing bonus of $2.00 million.

2015 season
Throughout training camp, Kendricks competed to be the starting middle linebacker against Audie Cole and Gerald Hodges. Head coach Mike Zimmer named Kendricks the backup middle linebacker to begin the regular season, behind starter Gerald Hodges.

He made his professional regular season debut in the Minnesota Vikings' season-opener at the San Francisco 49ers and made one solo tackle during their 20–3 loss. On October 4, 2015, Kendricks earned his first career start during a 23–20 loss at the Denver Broncos. He finished the Week 4 loss with four solo tackles and made his first career sack on Broncos quarterback Peyton Manning for a six-yard loss during the second quarter. On October 7, 2015, the Minnesota Vikings traded Gerald Hodges to the San Francisco 49ers, effectively making Kendricks the starting middle linebacker for the remainder of the season. In Week 6, Kendricks collected a season-high ten combined tackles (nine solo) during a 16–10 victory against the Kansas City Chiefs in Week 6. His ten combined tackles tied a franchise record by a rookie, along with Harrison Smith in 2012 and Malik Boyd in 1994. On October 25, 2015, Kendricks recorded six solo tackles and a season-high two sacks on quarterback Matthew Stafford as the Vikings defeated the Detroit Lions 28–19. On October 29, 2015, Kendricks was named the NFL Defensive Rookie for the month of October, when he posted 20 combined tackles, four sacks and 5 quarterback pressures in just three games. He became the first Vikings defensive player to win Rookie of the Month honors since Kevin Williams did it in 2003, and the eighth to win it overall. The last Vikings player to be selected Rookie of the Month was Cordarrelle Patterson in December 2013. Kendricks was inactive for two games (Weeks 9–10) due to a rib injury. While playing 14 games in 2015, Kendricks became the first rookie to lead the Vikings in tackles (92) since Rip Hawkins in 1961, helping Mike Zimmer's team win its first NFC North title in six years before falling to the Seahawks in the NFC Wild Card Game. He also posted 4.0 sacks, which is tied with Anthony Barr for the 2nd-most sacks by a rookie linebacker in team history, trailing only Dwayne Rudd, who finished his rookie season in 2015 with 5.0 sacks. On January 19, 2016, Kendricks was named to the Pro Football Writers of America's (PFWA) 2015 NFL All-Rookie team. Kendricks led the Vikings defense in tackles as a rookie with 92 total tackles, marking the first time a rookie has led the club in tackles since Rip Hawkins in 1961. Kendricks completed his rookie campaign with a total of 92 combined tackles (72 solo), four sacks, and one pass deflection in 14 games and 11 starts.

2016 season
After missing the entire preseason due to a hamstring injury he suffered early in training camp, Kendricks returned for the season opener game to bring back his first career interception 77 yards for a touchdown and post six tackles, including one for a loss, in Minnesota's 25–16 win over the Tennessee Titans at Nissan Stadium. His interception return late in the third quarter gave the Vikings their first lead of the game at 12–10 and was the sixth-longest by a Vikings linebacker ever and the longest interception return in the NFL during a Kickoff Weekend since Harrison Smith's 81 yarder at St. Louis in 2014. For his stellar performance in week 1, Kendricks earned NFC Defensive Player of the Week honors, becoming the eighth different Viking to win the award under head coach Mike Zimmer. In Week 5, Kendricks was stellar in coverage against the Houston Texans, as he gave up just two receptions on seven targets for 19 yards and broke up a pass according to Pro Football Focus (PFF).

2017 season
In 2017, Kendricks started all 16 games, recording a career-high and team-leading 113 tackles.

2018 season
On April 16, 2018, Kendricks signed a five-year, $50 million contract extension with the Vikings with $25 million guaranteed.  He played in and started 14 games. He finished the season with 108 tackles, two interceptions, one sack and a forced fumble.

2019 season
In Week 6 against the Philadelphia Eagles, Kendricks forced a fumble on tight end Zach Ertz that was recovered by teammate Anthony Barr in the 38–20 win. In Week 7 against the Detroit Lions, Kendricks recorded a team high 12 tackles in the 42–30 win. In Week 16 against the Green Bay Packers on Monday Night Football, Kendricks recovered a fumble forced by Anthony Barr on Aaron Jones and recovered another fumble forced by Harrison Smith on Davante Adams during the 23–10 loss.  During Kendricks' second fumble recovery, he suffered a quad injury and was forced to exit the game.

In the Divisional Round of the playoffs against the San Francisco 49ers, Kendricks intercepted a pass thrown by Jimmy Garoppolo and returned it for four yards during the 27–10 loss.

2020–2022 seasons
In Week 9 2020 season against the Detroit Lions, Kendricks recorded his first interception of the season off a pass thrown by Matthew Stafford during the 34–20 win.

On March 6, 2023, the Vikings released Kendricks.

Los Angeles Chargers
On March 14, 2023, Kendricks signed a two-year, $13.25 million contract with the Los Angeles Chargers.

NFL career statistics

Personal life
Kendricks' brother, Mychal, plays linebacker in the NFL. Their father led the Bruins in rushing in 1970 and 1971. Kendricks is the only active NFL player to be born on a leap day.

References

External links

Minnesota Vikings bio
UCLA Bruins bio

1992 births
Living people
Sportspeople from Clovis, California
Players of American football from California
American football linebackers
UCLA Bruins football players
Minnesota Vikings players
Los Angeles Chargers players
National Conference Pro Bowl players